Cao Huan (245/246–302/303), courtesy name Jingming, was the fifth and last emperor of the state of Cao Wei during the Three Kingdoms period. On 4 February 266, he abdicated the throne in favour of Sima Yan (later Emperor Wu of the Jin dynasty), and brought an end to the Wei regime. After his abdication, Cao Huan was granted the title "Prince of Chenliu" and held it until his death, after which he was posthumously honoured as "Emperor Yuan (of Cao Wei)".

Family background and accession to the throne
Cao Huan's birth name was "Cao Huang". His father, Cao Yu, the Prince of Yan, was a son of Cao Cao, the father of Wei's first emperor, Cao Pi. In 258, at the age of 12, in accordance with Wei's regulations that the sons of princes (other than the first-born son of the prince's spouse, customarily designated the prince's heir) were to be instated as dukes, Cao Huan was instated as the "Duke of Changdao District".

In June 260, after the ruling emperor Cao Mao was killed in an attempt to seize back state power from the regent Sima Zhao, Cao Huang was selected to succeed Cao Mao.

Reign

At the time Cao Huang became emperor, his name was changed to "Cao Huan" because it was difficult to observe naming taboo with the name "Huang" (which was a homonym to many common terms—including "yellow"  and "emperor" ). During Cao Huan's reign, the Sima clan controlled state power and Cao was merely a figurehead and head of state in name. On 28 Nov 263, Cao Huan instated his wife Lady Bian as empress.

For the first few years of Cao Huan's reign, there were constant attacks by forces from the rival Shu Han state under the command of Jiang Wei. While Jiang Wei's attacks were largely easily repelled, Sima Zhao eventually ordered a counterattack on Shu with an invading force of 180,000 men commanded by Zhong Hui and Deng Ai. In late 263, Liu Shan, the Shu emperor, surrendered to Deng, bringing an end to the state of Shu. After the fall of Shu, Deng Ai was framed for treason by Zhong Hui and stripped of command. In early 264, Zhong Hui plotted with Jiang Wei to restore Shu and eliminate all the Wei generals who might oppose him. However, the generals started a counterinsurgency and killed Zhong Hui and Jiang Wei. Shu's former territories (in present-day Sichuan, Chongqing, Yunnan, southern Shaanxi, and southeastern Gansu) were completely annexed by Wei.

Abdication and later life
Wei itself did not last much longer after Shu's collapse. In 263, Sima Zhao again forced Cao Huan to grant him the nine bestowments and this time he finally accepted signifying that a usurpation was near. In 264, Sima Zhao became a vassal king under the title "King of Jin" — the final step before usurpation. After Sima Zhao died in September 265, his son, Sima Yan, inherited his father's position and on 4 February 266 forced Cao Huan to abdicate, thereby establishing the Jin dynasty. He granted Cao Huan the title "Prince of Chenliu" which Cao Huan carried until his death.

Not much is known about Cao Huan's life as a prince under Jin rule. Sima Yan (later known as Emperor Wu of Jin) permitted him to retain imperial banners and wagons and to worship ancestors with imperial ceremonies. He also permitted Cao Huan not to refer to himself as a subject of his. He died in 302 during the reign of Emperor Wu's son, Emperor Hui. He was buried with honours due an emperor and given a posthumous name. 

It is not known who immediately succeeded Cao Huan as Prince of Chenliu, but in November or December 326, the title of Prince of Chenliu was conferred upon Cao Mai, a great-great grandson of Cao Cao, who held the title until his death on 1 December 358. He was succeeded by his son, Cao Hui, whose title was confirmed on 24 November 363. The title of Prince of Chenliu would remain within the Cao clan until it was abolished on 25 September 479 during the reign of Xiao Daocheng, founding emperor of Southern Qi; the final Prince of Chenliu was Cao Can (曹粲).

Era names
Jingyuan 260–264
Xianxi 264–266

Titles held
Prince of Chenliu
Emperor Yuan of Wei (posthumous title)

Family
Consorts:
 Empress, of the Bian clan

Ancestry

See also
 Cao Wei family trees
 Lists of people of the Three Kingdoms
 List of Chinese monarchs

References

 Chen, Shou (3rd century). Records of the Three Kingdoms (Sanguozhi).
 Pei, Songzhi (5th century). Annotations to Records of the Three Kingdoms (Sanguozhi zhu).

246 births
302 deaths
3rd-century Chinese monarchs
Cao Wei emperors
People from Handan